The vice-president of Azerbaijan is the second-highest constitutional office in Azerbaijan, after the president. The first and current vice-president is First Lady Mehriban Aliyeva. Ilham Aliyev, the president of Azerbaijan, created the position of vice president in 2017 and appointed his wife to the position. 

If Aliyev were to step down, Aliyeva would become the president of Azerbaijan. Critics, many of whom have labelled Aliyev an authoritarian leader, said the creation of the position was intended to consolidate the family's dynastic rule in Azerbaijan.

List of Vice President

Time in office

Formation
The office was established through a constitutional amendment that was approved by voters during a referendum on 26 September 2016. The amendment gives the president the power to appoint or dismiss the First Vice-President and vice-presidents of the Republic of Azerbaijan.

List of vice presidents

Powers
The Vice-President will become acting president if the president resigns or is incapacitated. Prior to the position being established, those duties devolved to the prime minister, who is now second in line after the vice president.

In terms of the resignation of the President from his/her post ahead of time, extraordinary presidential elections should be held within 60 days. In this case, powers of the President of the Republic of Azerbaijan are exercised by the First Vice-President of the Republic of Azerbaijan until the new President of the Republic is elected. If the First Vice-President, who is acting as the President of the Republic of Azerbaijan, resigns or is incapacitated due to health problems, the status of First Vice President passes to the Vice President of Azerbaijan in a specified sequence.

The Vice President of Azerbaijan can sign international interstate and intergovernmental agreements when the President delegates this authority to him/her.

Eligibility
To be eligible to be vice president, a person is required to be a citizen of Azerbaijan, possess voting rights, have a university degree, and have no responsibilities to other states.

On 21 February 2017, President Ilham Aliyev appointed his wife Mehriban Aliyeva to be the First Vice-President. If Aliyev would step down, Aliyeva would become President of Azerbaijan. Critics said the creation of the position was intended to consolidate the family's dynastic rule in Azerbaijan.

Immunity
The Vice-President of Azerbaijan enjoys the right of personal immunity during the whole term of his/her powers. The vice-president of the Azerbaijan Republic may not be arrested, searched, personally examined except cases when he/she has been caught red-handed. Immunity of the Vice-President of the Republic of Azerbaijan may be terminated only by the President of the Republic of Azerbaijan upon the presentation of the Prosecutor General of Azerbaijan.

Secretariat of the First Vice President
The Secretariat of the First Vice-President of Azerbaijan is composed of the following members:
 Altay Hasanov – Head of the Secretariat of the First Vice-President of the Republic of Azerbaijan 
 Mehdi Dadashov – Deputy Head of the Secretariat of the First Vice-President
 Yusuf Mammadaliyev – Assistant to the First Vice-President
 Elchin Amirbayov – Assistant to the First Vice-President
 Gunduz Karimov – Assistant to the First Vice-President
 Emin Huseynov – Assistant to the First Vice-President
 Khalid Ahadov – Assistant to the First Vice-President
 Andrei Sipilin – Assistant to the First Vice-President

See also
 President of Azerbaijan
 Presidential Administration of Azerbaijan

References

 
2017 establishments in Azerbaijan
Government of Azerbaijan
Azerbaijan
Titles held only by one person